Jack Fridtjof Charles Hücke Coucheron Nobel Nielsen (3 August 1896 – 9 January 1981) was a Norwegian tennis player. He was a six-time national tennis champion of Norway.

Biography
He was born in Egersund to Peter Godtfried Albert Nielsen, a customs chief officer, and Karen Andrea Coucheron Aamodt. He married Anne-Sofie Troye, daughter of a school principal in Trondheim. He was the father of skier Jack Nielsen.

Nielsen graduated as a chemical engineer from the Dresden University of Technology in 1917. In 1921 he earned his doctorate in the Karlsruhe Institute of Technology on Hydrogenation. In 1924 he worked as a brewmaster in Copenhagen. In 1918-19 he became chemist in the Aktieselskab Northern Chromate Industrial. In 1922-31 he was employed by the Christiania Aktie Ølbryggeri Oslo's main beer brewery, where he was promoted the head distiller. Between 1932-46 he switched to Nora Industrier also in Oslo, then in 1946 he moved to the Trondheim subsidiary where he lived and worked as the administrative director to 1962 and managing director to 1965. He finished his last year of his civil career at the E. C. Dahls Brewery from where he retired in 1966. Apart from being the president of several regional and national brewer labor unions and mineral water distributors, he was also the president of the Norwegian Tennis Federation and the Oslo Tennis Club for several years. He also filled in for the governor seat of the Rotary International between 1963-1964.

Tennis career
Nielsen participated at the 1920 Summer Olympics, where he placed fifth in doubles together with Conrad Langaard. He also competed at the 1924 Summer Olympics. He was a six-time national tennis champion of Norway. In the Davis Cup he never won a single match. In 1922 he was a runner-up for the mixed title of the Hotel Métropole Cup of Cannes alongside Madeline O'Neill of Great Britain but eventually lost to the French duo of Suzanne Lenglen and Jean Borotra. In 1930 he clinched the mixed doubles with his Danish partner Else Støckel of the Western Germany Championships at Krefeld by overcoming the couple of Ody Koopman and his wife.

References

External links
 
 
 

1896 births
1981 deaths
People from Egersund
Norwegian male tennis players
Olympic tennis players of Norway
Tennis players at the 1920 Summer Olympics
Tennis players at the 1924 Summer Olympics
Rotary International leaders
Sportspeople from Rogaland